"How to Love" is a 2011 song by Lil Wayne.

"How to Love" may also refer to:
How to Love (film), a 1947 Swedish film
"How to Love", a song by Sister Sledge from Love Somebody Today, 1980
"How to Love", a song by SG Wannabe from My Friend, 2008
"How to Love", a song by Cash Cash feat. Sofia Reyes from Blood, Sweat & 3 Years, 2016
怎么爱 (Pinyin: "Zěnme Ài" ; English: "How to Love"), a Chinese song by BoBo